Patrick McEnroe and Jonathan Stark were the defending champions, but did not participate this year.

Lan Bale and Brett Steven won in the final 6–3, 7–5, against Ken Flach and Stéphane Simian.

Seeds

  Todd Woodbridge /  Mark Woodforde (semifinals)
  Jim Grabb /  Jared Palmer (first round)
  Scott Davis /  Todd Martin (first round)
  Ken Flach /  Stéphane Simian (final)

Draw

Draw

External links
 Draw

Delray Beach Open
1994 ATP Tour